The Mala is a small left tributary of the Danube in Romania. It discharges into the Porțile de Fier I Reservoir, which is drained by the Danube, near Eșelnița.

References

Rivers of Romania
Rivers of Mehedinți County